Copelatus amatolensis is a species of diving beetle. It is part of the genus Copelatus of the subfamily Copelatinae in the family Dytiscidae. It was described by Omer-Cooper in 1965.

References

amatolensis
Beetles described in 1965